The 1997 election for Mayor of Los Angeles took place on April 8, 1997. Incumbent Richard Riordan won re-election against California State Senator and activist Tom Hayden. As of 2023, this is the most recent time a Republican was elected Mayor of Los Angeles.

Municipal elections in California, including Mayor of Los Angeles, are officially nonpartisan; candidates' party affiliations do not appear on the ballot.

Election 
Hayden criticized Riordan for ignoring the environment and for not debating with him while Riordan criticized Hayden for his voting record as a State Senator. Polls showed Riordan leading Hayden, with most of his support being from white people and Republicans. The Los Angeles County Federation of Labor pulled their support from Riordan and took a neutral stance for the two. In the election, Riordan won outright against Hayden and three other candidates.

Results

References and footnotes

External links
 Office of the City Clerk, City of Los Angeles

Los Angeles mayoral election
1997
Los Angeles
Mayoral election
Los Angeles Mayoral election